The following is an episode list for the Disney Channel animated series The Replacements. The first episode aired on July 28, 2006, as a sneak preview, while the series originally started airing on September 8, 2006. The series ended in 2009 with a total of 52 episodes, as said by Dan Santat. While the majority of season one episodes consisted of two eleven-minute shorts, season two transitioned to having mostly half-hour episodes with a single plot. The series finale, "Irreplaceable", aired on March 30, 2009.

Series overview

Episodes

Season 1 (2006–07)
Note: All episodes in Season 1 were directed by Heather Martinez

Season 2 (2008–09)Note: This season was not included when the series arrived on Disney+ and is still currently not available.

References

External links

Lists of American children's animated television series episodes
Lists of Disney Channel television series episodes